Kolb may refer to:

 Kolb (surname), a German surname
 Kolb, Wisconsin, United States, an unincorporated community
 Kolb Aircraft Company, an American aircraft manufacturer
 Kolb Studio, a historic structure in Grand Canyon Village, Arizona, United States
 Banque Kolb, a French bank within retail banking network Crédit du Nord